Mauro Giuliani's "Rossiniane" are a virtuoso variations cycle for the guitar based on themes by Rossini.  One of the unique features of these Galant Classical compositions is that they were jointly composed by Giuliani, Paganini (who also mastered the guitar), and Rossini himself at Rossini's villa. Mauro Giuliani (who died in 1829) alone is formally credited with composing the six sets of jointly composed  variations for guitar on themes by Rossini, Opp. 119–124 (c. 1820–1828). Each set was called "Rossiniana", and collectively they are called "Rossiniane". This was the first known tribute by one composer to another using a title with the ending -ana.

Giuliani's achievements as a composer were numerous. Giuliani's 150 compositions for guitar with opus number constitute the nucleus of the nineteenth-century guitar repertory. He composed extremely challenging pieces for solo guitar as well as works for orchestra and guitar-violin and guitar-flute duos.

Outstanding pieces by Giuliani include his three guitar concertos (op. 30-36 and 70); a series of six fantasias for guitar solo, op. 119-124, based on airs from Rossini operas and entitled the "Rossiniane."

Themes in Giuliani's Le Rossiniane

Rossiniana I, Op. 119–Introduction (Andantino)
“Assisa a piè d’un salice” (Otello)
“Languir per una bella” Scene 3 atto 1, Andante grazioso (L’Italienne à Alger)
“Ai capricci della sorte” Scene 5 atto 1, Maestoso (L’Italienne à Alger)
”Caro, caro ti parlo in petto”, Moderato (L’Italienne à Alger)
“Cara, per te quest’anima”, Allegro Vivace (Armida)

Rossiniana II, Op. 120–Introduction (Sostenuto)
“Deh ! Calma, o ciel”, Andantino sostenuto (Otello)
“Arditi all’ire”, Allegretto innocente (Armida)
“Non più mesta accanto al fuoco”, Maestoso (Cendrillon)
“Di piacer mi balza il cor”, (La pie voleuse)
“Fertilissima Regina”, Allegretto (Cendrillon)

Rossiniana III, Op. 121–Introduction (Maestoso Sostenuto)
“Un soave non so che” (Cendrillon)
“Oh mattutini albori!”, Andantino (La dame du lac)
“Questo vecchio maledetto”, (Le Turc en Italie)
“Sorte! Secondami”, Allegro (Zelmira)
“Cinto di nuovi allori”, Maestoso (Ricciardo et Zoraïde)

Rossiniana IV, Op. 122–Introduction (Sostenuto-Allegro Maestoso)
“Forse un dì conoscerete”, Andante (La pie voleuse)
“Mi cadono le lagrime” (La pie voleuse)
“Ah se puoi così lasciarmi”, Allegro Maestoso (Moïse en Egypte)
“Piacer egual gli dei”, Maestoso (Mathilde de Shabran)
“Voglio ascoltar” (La pierre de touche)

Rossiniana V, Op. 123–Introduction (Allegro con brio)
“E tu quando tornerai”, Andantino mosso (Tancrède)
“Una voce poco fa” (Le Barbier de Séville)
“Questo è un nodo avviluppato”, Andante sostenuto (Cendrillon)
“Là seduto l’amato Giannetto”, Allegro (La pie voleuse)
“Zitti zitti, piano piano”, Allegro (Le Barbier de Séville)

Rossiniana VI, Op. 124–Introduction (Maestoso)
“Qual mesto gemito”, Larghetto (Sémiramis)
“Oh quante lagrime finor versai”, Maestoso (La dame du lac)
“Questo nome che suona vittoria”, Allegro brillante (Le siège de Corinthe)

The "Introduction" from Rossiniana No. 2 has become well known in popular culture due to its inclusion in the Counter Strike Italy map.

References

Compositions by Mauro Giuliani